United Bus was a bus manufacturing group created by DAF Bus and Bova (both from the Netherlands) in 1989. It was later joined by Den Oudsten (Netherlands), Optare (UK), and DAB (Denmark).

Collaborations
The collaboration between DAF and Optare led to the introduction of the DAF DB250 double-decker with Optare Spectra bodywork. This was the first partly low-floor double-decker and set the standard for future developments.

Demise
Due to the 1991-1995 world recession, United Bus filed for bankruptcy in 1993, though the partners survived independently.

References

Bus manufacturers of the Netherlands
Vehicle manufacturing companies disestablished in 1989
Dutch companies established in 1989
Vehicle manufacturing companies established in 1989
Dutch companies disestablished in 1993